Erzgebirgskreis I is an electoral constituency (German: Wahlkreis) represented in the Bundestag. It elects one member via first-past-the-post voting. Under the current constituency numbering system, it is designated as constituency 164. It is located in southwestern Saxony, comprising most of the Erzgebirgskreis district.

Erzgebirgskreis I was created for the 2009 federal election. Since 2021, it has been represented by Thomas Dietz of the Alternative for Germany (AfD).

Geography
Erzgebirgskreis I is located in southwestern Saxony. As of the 2021 federal election, it comprises the entirety of the Erzgebirgskreis district excluding the municipalities of Hohndorf, Jahnsdorf, Neukirchen, Oelsnitz, Thalheim, and Zwönitz and the Verwaltungsgemeinschaften of Burkhardtsdorf, Lugau, and Stollberg.

History
Erzgebirgskreis I was created in 2009 and contained parts of the abolished constituencies of Bundestagswahlkreis Freiberg – Mittlerer Erzgebirgskreis and Annaberg – Aue-Schwarzenberg. In the 2009 election, it was constituency 165 in the numbering system. Since 2013, it has been number 164. Its borders have not changed since its creation.

Members
The constituency was first represented by Günter Baumann of the Christian Democratic Union (CDU) from 2009 to 2017. He was succeeded by Alexander Krauß in 2017. Thomas Dietz won the constituency for the Alternative for Germany (AfD) in 2021.

Election results

2021 election

2017 election

2013 election

2009 election

Notes

References

Federal electoral districts in Saxony
2009 establishments in Germany
Constituencies established in 2009
Erzgebirgskreis